Big Bone is an unincorporated community in southern Boone County, Kentucky, United States.  It is bounded on the west by the Ohio River, and Rabbit Hash, on the south by Big Bone Creek, which empties into the river at Big Bone Landing.  The northern extent is along Hathaway Road, and the eastern portion extends not further than U.S. 42, and is approached from that direction by Beaver Road (Route 338) coming from either Richwood or Walton. Big Bone took its name from a nearby prehistoric mineral lick of the same name. Geographical features of interest include Big Bone Lick State Park and the now disappeared Big Bone Island.

History
A post office called Bigbone was established in 1890, and remained in operation until 1941. The area was named after the extraordinarily large bones, including mammoths and mastodons, found in the swamps around the salt lick frequented by animals, who need salt in their diets. The fossil deposits were a well known feature in the geographical region.

Geography
Big Bone Lick, now the site of Big Bone Lick State Park, is a well-known landmark in the immediate area of Big Bone. The salt lick, or lick, as it is more generally known locally, was long known to the original inhabitants of the area. It was discovered by people of European descent about 1735, the first recorded instance being one Charles Lemoyne de Longueil, a French Captain, in 1739. Robert Smith, an Indian trader, was another early subject that understood the importance of the bones and site.  Other notable visitors were Daniel Boone, William Clark, William Henry Harrison, Christopher Columbus Graham, Mary Draper Ingles, Constantine S. Rafinesque, and many others.

Big Bone Creek enters the Ohio River at mile 516.8 below Pittsburgh. The mouth is at the division of Boone and Gallatin Counties, Kentucky, near the site of Big Bone Island. It is navigable for several miles, and flows through Big Bone Lick State Park.

Big Bone Island
Big Bone Island was a small, natural island composed of sand and gravel in the Ohio River near the mouth of Big Bone Creek at Big Bone. It is just south of the Boone County line in Gallatin County, Kentucky. Of note is that the county line "runs down the center of the creek". It plays a part in local lore and history of the area and was a popular fishing and camping location. The island has disappeared due mostly to the raising of the river caused by the placement of the Markland Dam, but also due to slabs of floating river ice which destroyed much of the vegetation and carried away most of the soil.

In January 1978, the Ohio River rapidly rose from 29.6 feet on January 25 to 53.9 feet on January 30, during what has been described as "one of the most severe winter months in southwestern Ohio history." This caused an enormous ice jam, which eventually broke, sending "a wall of ice and water" downstream. It has been stated that the decisions and actions of the U.S. Army Corps of Engineers on January 27, 1978 at the Markland Dam caused the ice jam to break.  This was characterized as being perhaps the worst disaster in modernity on the Ohio River, and caused significant damage, with entire docks, barges and boats crammed against or forced through the Markland dam, and many boats and barges sunk.  The ice literally "shaved off" Big Bone Island at the time.

Sometime in the 1970s, the island disappeared entirely.

References

Further reading

External links
 Historical Documents at Big Bone History
 Historical Images of Big Bone
 Lewis and Clark and Big Bone Lick
 Big Bone Lick Blog

Unincorporated communities in Boone County, Kentucky
Unincorporated communities in Kentucky